State Route 573 (SR 573) comprises two sections of Craig Road, a major east–west arterial roadway in the Las Vegas valley.

Route description

The first section of SR 573 begins at the Craig Road interchange with U.S. Route 95. From there, it proceeds eastward to the Las Vegas–North Las Vegas city limits at Decatur Boulevard.

The second section of SR 573 resumes at the intersection of Craig Road and Frehner Road in the city of North Las Vegas. From this point, the highway continues east on Craig Road where it has a junction at Interstate 15 and U.S. Route 93. SR 573 has an intersection with Lamb Boulevard (SR 610) where the highway enters the unincorporated town of Sunrise Manor. SR 573 eventually reaches its eastern terminus at Las Vegas Boulevard (SR 604) at the main entrance to Nellis Air Force Base.

History
Previously, the portion of Craig Road within North Las Vegas (between Decatur Boulevard and Frehner Road) was a part of SR 573. This section was decommissioned in 2002 and turned over to the City of North Las Vegas, which promptly reconstructed the roadway.

Major intersections

Public transport
RTC Transit Route 219 functions on this road.

See also

References

573